Movin' On or Moving On may refer to:

Film and television
 Moving On (1974 film), an Australian film
 Moving On (2022 film), an American dark comedy
 Movin' On (TV series), a 1974–1976 American drama series
 Moving On (TV series), a 2009–present British anthology series
 Hollyoaks: Movin' On, a spin-off of the UK soap opera Hollyoaks

Television episodes
 "Moving On" (Abby), 2003
 "Moving On" (House), 2011
 "Moving On" (The Office), 2013
 "Moving On" (Tracy Beaker Returns), 2010

Music

Albums
 Moving On (911 album) or the title song, 1998
 Movin' On (Commodores album), 1975
 Movin' On (The Greencards album), 2003
 Moving On (Oleta Adams album), 1995
 Movin' On (Playa Fly album) or the title song, 1998
 Movin' On (Reuben Wilson album) or the title song, 2006
 Moving On (Sarah Dawn Finer album) or the title song (see below), 2009
 Movin' On, by Buddy Greco, 1973
 Moving On, by John Mayall, 1972
 Moving On, by Myleene Klass, 2003
 Movin' On, by Oscar Brown, 1972
 Moving On, by Ozomatli, 2020
 Movin' On, by Ralph Bowen, 1992
 Moving On, by the San Francisco Boys Chorus, 2003
 Moving On, by Unter Null, 2010
 Movin' On, by Vicki Sue Robinson, 1979

Songs
 "Moving On" (Asking Alexandria song), 2014
 "Movin' On" (Bad Company song), 1974
 "Movin' On" (Bananarama song), 1992
 "Movin' On" (CeCe Peniston song), 1996
 "Movin' On" (Dream song), 2000
 "Movin' On" (Elliott Yamin song), 2007
 "Moving On" (Marshmello song), 2017
 "Movin' On" (Merle Haggard song), the theme song from the TV series, 1975
 "Movin' On" (Mýa song), 1998
 "Movin' On" (The Rankins song), 1998
 "Moving On" (Sarah Dawn Finer song), 2009
 "Moving On" (Taio Cruz song), 2007
 "Moving On" (Zhang Liyin song), 2009
 "Moving On", by Adonxs, 2022
 "Moving On", by Bleach from Astronomy, 2003
 "Movin' On", by Blur from Blur, 1997
 "Movin' On", by Crystal Bowersox from All That for This, 2013
 "Moving On", by Gary Moore from Still Got the Blues, 1990
 "Movin' On", by Good Charlotte from The Young and the Hopeless, 2002
 "Moving On", by Good Charlotte from Youth Authority, 2016
 "Movin' On", by Gotthard from G., 1996
 "Movin' On", by Ian Van Dahl, 2005
 "Moving On", by James from La Petite Mort, 2014
 "Movin' On", by Joe Satriani from Super Colossal, 2006
 "Moving On", by Kimya Dawson from Hidden Vagenda, 2004
 "Moving On", by King Diamond from Give Me Your Soul...Please, 2007
 "Moving On", by Leonard Cohen from Thanks for the Dance, 2020
 "Movin' On", by Masta Ace from Take a Look Around, 1990
 "Movin' On", by Missouri from Missouri, 1977
 "Movin' On", by Musiq Soulchild from Luvanmusiq, 2007
 "Moving On", by Rod Wave from SoulFly, 2021
 "Moving On", by Ryuichi Sakamoto from Sweet Revenge, 1994
 "Movin' On", by Sandaime J Soul Brothers, 2020
 "Moving On", by Sixpence None the Richer from Sixpence None the Richer, 1997
 "Movin' On", by Status Quo from Quid Pro Quo, 2011
 "Moving On", by Toya from Toya, 2001

See also
 I'm Movin' On (disambiguation)
 Moving On Up (disambiguation)